Ralph was  Archdeacon of Barnstaple until 1143.

References

Archdeacons of Barnstaple